The official soundtrack for The Prince of Egypt was released on November 17, 1998. It features songs and scoring from the film, as well as songs not used in the film. The album peaked at No. 1 on Billboard magazine's Top Contemporary Christian chart, and No. 25 on the Billboard 200 chart.

In addition to this album, tie-in albums were also released; a collector's edition, a country edition, and an inspirational edition. These other albums contained music that was not featured in the movie but rather inspired by the Biblical story of Exodus.

The album also spawned a pair of hit singles. The first track, "When You Believe", was a duet performed by Mariah Carey and Whitney Houston, while the sixteenth track, "Through Heaven's Eyes", was performed by R&B duo K-Ci & JoJo, and the album's final track, "I Will Get There", was performed a cappella by R&B quartet Boyz II Men.

Songs
"Deliver Us" is the film's opening number, serving to show the violence and hardships endured by the Hebrew slaves, and the despair of Moses's mother. The song alternates dramatically between male slave voices over heavy drum beats, and women's voices singing a gentle lullaby to the baby Moses.

The lullaby portion of "Deliver Us" was performed by Israeli singer Ofra Haza and Disney actress Eden Riegel, while the music was composed by Hans Zimmer. Christopher Coleman explained "'Deliver Us' features the powerful vocals I was hoping for... This track concludes with an abruptness which is very similar to the opening track of Zimmer’s Oscar-winning score for The Lion King." Stephen Schwartz explained his use of the word "Elohim" in the song. "I wanted an authentic sounding Hebrew reference to God to help set the time and place. My first choice was "Adonai", but I was told by the religious consultants on the film that it would have been sacrilegious to use that term in that way in those days. So I selected "Elohim" instead, partly because it was slightly archaic, and partly because the scansion of the word fit the music!" 

"All I Ever Wanted" is sung by Amick Byram as Moses, after Moses discovers he is adopted, which results in him questioning his Egyptian identity and his Hebrew heritage. It is reprised shortly after by Linda Dee Shayne playing the role of Queen of Egypt, who reassures Moses of his place in their family. The song was written by Stephen Schwartz, who visited an Egyptian temple for inspiration. "There was something about walking through those beautiful white columns reflected in the moonlight and seeing the hieroglyphs that triggered the tune which became, 'All I Ever Wanted.'" Filmtracks wrote "The uplifting and buoyant 'All I Ever Wanted' is the closest Schwartz comes to emulating the hero's song of aspiration that Alan Menken made famous throughout the decade. The determination in this short song is convincing and the queen's reprise is elegantly merged with the river melody from 'Deliver Us' at its conclusion." However, Entertainment Weekly wrote "Even on repeat listenings, Moses' requisite I-want song – called, lamely, 'All I Ever Wanted' – simply isn't memorable, no matter that the star-crossed royal helpfully whistles snatches of it in another scene." LA Weekly described it as "one of Stephen Schwartz's awful songs".

"Through Heaven's Eyes" is performed in the film by Brian Stokes Mitchell, while the pop single version is performed by R&B duo K-Ci & JoJo. Stokes Mitchell provides the singing voice for Danny Glover's Jethro character, Tzipporah's father and Moses's future father-in-law. Music and lyrics are by Stephen Schwartz, who said the song was his "favorite" of the film: "...one of the directors, Steven Hickner, came in with a poem called 'The Measure of a Man', and I based the lyric for the song on the philosophy in the poem..." Filmtracks said the song is a listener favorite but the voice of Stokes Mitchell overwhelmed the folk music background. Filmtracks wrote that "the K-Ci & Jo Jo version of 'Through Heaven's Eyes', will be intolerable for most film score collectors." Entertainment Weekly described the song as "the 'Hava Nagila'–style campfire rave".

Filmtracks notes: "'The Plagues'...challenges the lyrical nature of the film's early songs with deliberately harsh chanting..."

Critical reception
At the 71st Academy Awards, the film won Best Original Song for “When You Believe.”

Track listing

Charts

Weekly charts

Monthly charts

Year-end charts

Certifications and sales

References 

1990s film soundtrack albums
DreamWorks Records soundtracks
Albums produced by Michael Omartian
1998 soundtrack albums
The Prince of Egypt
Contemporary R&B soundtracks